Jorge Amaya (born 31 July 1934) is an Argentine equestrian. He competed in the individual jumping event at the 1968 Summer Olympics.

References

External links
 

1934 births
Living people
Argentine male equestrians
Olympic equestrians of Argentina
Equestrians at the 1968 Summer Olympics
Pan American Games medalists in equestrian
Pan American Games silver medalists for Argentina
Equestrians at the 1963 Pan American Games
Sportspeople from Buenos Aires
Medalists at the 1963 Pan American Games